Angela Little may refer to:

Angela Little (academic) (born 1949), British education and development academic
Angela Little (actress) (born 1972), American model and actress